Father and Sons is a 2003 French-Canadian comedy film directed by Michel Boujenah.

Plot
Leo is neglected by his children David, Max, and Simon, and two of them are estranged. Afraid of dying without seeing his boys reconcile, he invents a serious illness to force them to take a trip to Quebec with him.

Cast and characters

References

External links
 

2003 comedy films
2003 films
French comedy films
Canadian comedy films
French-language Canadian films
2000s Canadian films
2000s French films